Julio Lobo is a Brazilian Muay Thai fighter.

Championships and awards

 2013 FEPLAM −63.5 kg Champion
 2018 Toyota Marathon 140 lbs Tournament Champion
 2021 Omnoi Stadium 147 lbs Champion

Fight record

|-  style="background:#cfc"
| 2022-11-05 || Win||align=left| Darky NokKhao-GorMor.11 || Samui Super Fight, Phetchbuncha Stadium || Ko Samui, Thailand || Decision|| 5 ||3:00
|-  style="background:#cfc"
| 2022-09-23 || Win ||align=left| PhetUtong Or.Kwanmuang || Muay Thai Lumpinee Pitaktam, Lumpinee Stadium || Bangkok, Thailand || KO (Elbow)|| 2 ||
|- style="background:#fbb" 
| 2022-07-22 || Loss ||align="left" | Yodkhunpon Sitmonchai || Rajadamnern World Series  || Bangkok, Thailand || KO (Left hook)|| 2 || 
|-  style="background:#fbb"
| 2022-06-16 || Loss ||align=left| Yodkompatak SinbiMuayThai || Singpaong, Patong Stadium || Phuket, Thailand || Decision || 5 || 3:00
|-  style="background:#fbb;"
| 2022-05-14 || Loss ||align=left| Sajad Sattari || Venum Fight, Rajadamnern Stadium || Bangkok, Thailand|| Decision || 5 || 3:00
|-
! style=background:white colspan=9 |
|-  style="background:#fbb"
| 2022-03-21 || Loss ||align=left| Shadow Singmawynn || Singmawin, Rajadamnern Stadium || Bangkok, Thailand || Decision || 5 ||3:00
|-
! style=background:white colspan=9 |
|-  style="background:#cfc;"
| 2022-01-09 || Win||align=left| Saensiri J.PowerRoofPhuket|| Muay Thai Super Champ || Phuket, Thailand || Decision || 3 ||3:00 
|-  style="background:#cfc;"
| 2021-07-03 || Win||align=left| Rambo Petch-Por.Tor.Or|| SuekJaoMuayThai, Fonjang Chonburi Stadium || Chonburi, Thailand || Decision || 5 ||3:00 
|-
! style=background:white colspan=9 |
|-  style="background:#cfc;"
| 2021-03-19|| Win ||align=left| Yodphupa Bermphudin || Suek Pitakham, Lumpinee Stadium|| Bangkok, Thailand || TKO (Ref Stoppage)||4 ||
|-  style="background:#fbb;"
| 2020-12-18|| Loss ||align=left| Littewada Sitthikul || Suk Singmawin || Songkhla, Thailand || KO (left elbow) || 2 ||
|-  style="background:#fbb;"
| 2020-11-17|| Loss||align=left| Phonek Or.Kwanmuang || Sor.Sommai, CentralPlaza Nakhon Ratchasima|| Nakhon Ratchasima, Thailand ||Decision ||5 ||3:00
|-  style="background:#cfc;"
| 2020-10-26|| Win ||align=left| Panpayak Sitchefboontham || Chef Boontham, Rangsit Stadium || Rangsit, Thailand || KO (Elbows)||3 ||
|-  style="background:#cfc;"
| 2020-09-10|| Win||align=left| Prabsuek Siopol || Sor.Sommai Birhtday, Rajadamnern Stadium || Bangkok, Thailand || Decision || 5|| 3:00
|-  style="background:#fbb;"
| 2020-08-13|| Loss ||align=left| Tapaokaew Singmawynn || Singmawin, Rajadamnern Stadium || Bangkok, Thailand || Decision || 5 || 3:00
|-  style="background:#fbb;"
| 2020-07-12|| Loss ||align=left| Shadow Tor.Thepsutin ||  Or.Tor.Gor 3 Stadium || Nonthaburi Province, Thailand || Decision || 5 || 3:00
|-  style="background:#c5d2ea;"
| 2020-03-06|| Draw ||align=left| Shadow Tor.Thepsutin ||  Lumpinee Stadium || Bangkok, Thailand ||Decision||  5||3:00
|-  style="background:#cfc;"
| 2020-02-09||Win ||align=left| Shadow Tor.Thepsutin || Srithammaracha + Kiatpetch Super Fight || Nakhon Si Thammarat, Thailand ||Decision||  5|| 3:00
|-  style="background:#cfc;"
| 2020-01-04||Win || align="left" | Bin Parunchai || Lumpinee Stadium || Bangkok, Thailand || KO (Low Kick)|| 3 ||
|-  style="background:#cfc;"
| 2019-11-02|| Win|| align="left" | Pakorn PKSaenchaimuaythaigym || Maximum Muay Thai Fight || Brazil, São Paulo || Decision || 5 || 3:00
|-  style="background:#cfc;"
| 2019-08-17|| Win|| align="left" | Pinphet Sitdjeadeng || Lumpinee Stadium || Bangkok, Thailand || Decision || 5 || 3:00
|- style="background:#cfc;"
| 2019-07-13||Win|| align="left" | Manachai|| Lumpinee Stadium|| Bangkok, Thailand||KO (Elbow)||4||0:20
|-  style="background:#fbb;"
| 2019-06-15|| Loss|| align="left" | Pinpetch Sitjaydaeng || Lumpinee Stadium || Bangkok, Thailand ||Decision || 5 || 3:00
|-  style="background:#cfc;"
| 2019-05-19|| Win|| align="left" |  Simanut Sor.Sarinya || Blue Arena ||  Thailand || KO || 1 ||
|-  style="background:#fbb;"
| 2019-02-05|| Loss|| align="left" | Kiatpetch SuanArharnPeekmai || Lumpinee Stadium || Bangkok, Thailand ||Decision || 5 || 3:00
|-  style="background:#fbb;"
| 2018-12-21|| Loss||align=left| Savvas Michael || Toyota Revo Marathon Tournament, Final || Songkhla, Thailand || Decision || 5 || 3:00
|-
! style=background:white colspan=9 |
|-  style="background:#cfc;"
| 2018-12-21|| Win||align=left| Felipe Gois  || Toyota Revo Marathon Tournament, Semi Final || Songkhla, Thailand || || ||
|- style="background:#fbb;"
| 2018-10-29|| Loss|| align="left" | Manachai|| YOKKAO 34|| Hong Kong||Decision ||5||3:00
|-
! style=background:white colspan=9 |
|-  style="background:#cfc;"
| 2018-09-09|| Win|| align="left" | Kiatpetch SuanArharnPeekmai || Super Champ || Bangkok, Thailand ||TKO (Doctor Stoppage/Elbow)|| 3 ||
|-  style="background:#fbb;"
| 2018-08-25 || Loss||align=left| Khayal Dzhaniev || Glory 57: Shenzhen || Shenzhen, China || Decision (Unanimous) || 3 || 3:00
|-  style="background:#cfc;"
| 2018-06-21 || Win||align=left| Kundiao Payakampan || Toyota Marathon Tournament, Final || Thailand || KO (Knee to the Body) || 1 || 
|-
! style=background:white colspan=9 |
|-  style="background:#cfc;"
| 2018-06-21 || Win||align=left| Jomrachan Bangeuro || Toyota Marathon Tournament, Semi Final || Thailand || KO (Knees) || 2 ||
|-  style="background:#cfc;"
| 2018-06-21 || Win||align=left| Kobilbek Tolabaev || Toyota Marathon Tournament, Quarter Final || Thailand || KO (Knee to the Body) ||  ||
|-  style="background:#fbb;"
| 2018-04-28 || Loss||align=left| Taksila Chor Happayak || Pheoenix 7 || Phuket, Thailand || Decision || 3 || 3:00
|-  style="background:#fbb;"
| 2018-02-10 || Loss||align=left| Yodpanomrung Jitmuangnon || Top King World Series 17 || China || Decision || 3 || 3:00
|-  style="background:#fbb;"
| 2017-12-16|| Loss|| align="left" | Intarachai Thor Thepsutin || WPMF King's Birthday ||  Bangkok, Thailand || Decision || 5 || 3:00 
|-
! style=background:white colspan=9 |
|-  style="background:#cfc;"
| 2017-12-01|| Win|| align="left" | || ||  China || Decision|| 3 || 3:00
|-  style="background:#cfc;"
| 2017-11-11|| Win|| align="left" | Flo Singpatong || Pattong Boxing Stadium || Thailand || KO (Low Kick)|| 3 ||
|-  style="background:#cfc;"
| 2017-09-24|| Win|| align="left" | Deregea || Bangla Boxing Stadium || Thailand || ||  ||
|-  style="background:#fbb;"
| 2017-08-20|| Loss|| align="left" | Pakorn PKSaenchaimuaythaigym || All-Star Fight || Bangkok, Thailand || Decision || 3 || 3:00
|-  style="background:#fbb;"
| 2017-07-28|| Loss|| align="left" | Buakiew Por.Pongsawang || King's Birthday || Thailand || Decision|| 5 || 3:00  
|-
! style=background:white colspan=9 |
|-  style="background:#cfc;"
| 2017-06-23|| Win|| align="left" | Marlon Singpatong || Lumpinee Stadium || Thailand || Decision|| 5 || 3:00
|-  style="background:#cfc;"
| 2017-05-14|| Win|| align="left" | Li Yankun || Kunlun Fight 61 || Sanya, China || Decision || 3 || 3:00
|-  style="background:#cfc;"
| 2017-02-18|| Win||align=left|  || Super Muay Thai|| Thailand || Decision || 5 || 3:00
|-  style="background:#cfc;"
| 2017-02-01|| Win||align=left| Chalarmakao || Andaman Fight, Final || Phuket, Thailand || TKO || 3 ||
|-  style="background:#cfc;"
| 2017-02-01|| Win||align=left| Ryan Sutai MuayThai || Andaman Fight, Semi Final || Phuket, Thailand || Decision || 3 || 3:00
|-  style="background:#fbb;"
| 2016-12-24|| Loss||align=left| Saenchai || Thai Fight || Bangkok, Thailand || Decision || 3 || 3:00
|-  style="background:#cfc;"
| 2016-11-19|| Win||align=left| Anvar Boynazarov || Thai Fight Airrace 1 || Ban Chang, Thailand || Decision || 3 || 3:00
|-  style="background:#cfc;"
| 2016-09-16|| Win||align=left|  || Bangla Boxing Stadium  || Thailand || Decision || 5 || 3:00
|-  style="background:#cfc;"
| 2016-08-20|| Win||align=left| Victor Pinto || Thai Fight Phra Chom Klao Ladkrabang || Bangkok, Thailand || Decision || 3 || 3:00
|-  style="background:#cfc;"
| 2016-08-07|| Win||align=left| Superjoke || Max Muay Thai|| Pattaya, Thailand || KO || 3 ||
|-  style="background:#fbb;"
| 2016-07-27|| Loss||align=left| Brian Denis || Prince's Birthday || Bangkok, Thailand || Decision || 5 || 3:00
|-
! style=background:white colspan=9 |
|-  style="background:#cfc;"
| 2016-06|| Win||align=left| Bruno Marques || Top Thai Brasil IV  || Brazil || Decision || 3 || 3:00
|-
! style=background:white colspan=9 |
|-  style="background:#fbb;"
| 2016-05-14|| Loss||align=left| Luis Cajaiba || Epic Muaythai Brasil 2, Semi Final || Sao Paulo, Brazil || Decision || 3 || 3:00
|-  style="background:#cfc;"
| 2016-03-26|| Win||align=left| Michael de Oliveira || Thai I Santos Max || Sao Paulo, Brazil || KO (Low Kick)|| 2 ||
|-  style="background:#cfc;"
| 2016-02-20|| Win||align=left| Julio Maximus || Epic Muaythai Brasil, Final || Sao Paulo, Brazil || Decision || 3 || 3:00
|-  style="background:#cfc;"
| 2016-02-20|| Win||align=left| Alexander Costela || Epic Muaythai Brasil, Semi Final || Sao Paulo, Brazil || KO (Low Kick)|| 2 ||
|-  style="background:#cfc;"
| 2015-11|| Win||align=left| Felipe Lobo || Portuários Stadium || Brazil || KO (Head Kick)|| 1 ||
|-  style="background:#cfc;"
| 2015-11-07|| Win||align=left| Jordan Kranio || XI Desafio de Muay Thai  || Brazil || KO || 3 ||
|-  style="background:#fbb;"
| 2015-09|| Loss||align=left| Luis Cajaiba || Maximum Muay Thai 2 || Brazil || Decision || 5 || 3:00
|-  style="background:#cfc;"
| 2015-03|| Win||align=left| Romulo Augusto || Portuários Stadium || Brazil || Decision|| 5 || 3:00
|-  style="background:#cfc;"
| 2014-12-14|| Win||align=left| Cadu Portela || Maximum Muay Thai  || Brazil || KO (Elbow)|| 2 ||
|- style="background:#cfc;"
| 2014|| Win|| align="left" | Fahsathan|| || Thailand || Decision|| 3 || 3:00
|-  style="background:#cfc;"
| 2014-10-17|| Win||align=left| Martin Avery || Bangla Boxing Stadium || Phuket, Thailand || Decision|| 5 || 3:00
|-  style="background:#cfc;"
| 2014-09-22|| Win||align=left| Aikkewzang || Pattong Boxing Stadium || Phuket, Thailand || KO (Knee to the Body)|| 2 ||
|-  style="background:#cfc;"
| 2014-09-05|| Win||align=left| Vadim SaifaMT || Bangla Boxing Stadium || Phuket, Thailand || TKO (Referee Stoppage/Knee)|| 2 ||
|- style="background:#cfc;"
| 2014|| Win|| align="left" |  Lucas Wallace || FEPLAM || Sao Paulo, Brazil || TKO || 4 ||
|-  style="background:#cfc;"
| 2013-10-05|| Win||align=left|  André Urso|| Torneio Revelação, Final || Sao Paulo, Brazil || Decision|| 3 || 3:00 
|-
! style=background:white colspan=9 |
|-  style="background:#cfc;"
| 2013-10-05|| Win||align=left| Ricardo Pacheco|| Torneio Revelação, Semi Final || Sao Paulo, Brazil || Decision|| 3 || 3:00
|-  style="background:#cfc;"
| 2012-11-12|| Win||align=left| Lucas Salompas|| Invictus Muay Thai II  || Brazil || Decision|| 3 || 3:00 
|-
| colspan=9 | Legend:

References

External links
 Official Glory profile

1994 births
Living people
Brazilian male kickboxers
Lightweight kickboxers
Glory kickboxers
Brazilian Muay Thai practitioners